Paul Henry de Kock, better known as Henry de Kock, (25 April 1819 – 14 April 1892) was a 19th-century French playwright, novelist, and chansonnier, famous for his salacious novels.

Biography 
The son of Paul de Kock, he wrote feuilletons which gained a significant success such as La Voleuse d’amour (1863), L’Auberge des treize pendus (1866), Folies de jeunesse (1866), Ni fille, ni femme, ni veuve (1867), La Fille de son père (1869), Mademoiselle ma femme (1868) or Les Douze travaux d’Ursule (1885).

His Histoire des célèbres courtisanes, his most famous work, translated into four languages, had nine editions from 1869 to 2008.

Works 
Novels

 Berthe, l'amoureuse, G. Roux et O. Cassanet, 1843
 La reine des grisettes, G. Roux et Cassanet, 1844
 Le Bon Dieu, pamphlet républicain, 1848
 Brin d'Amour, A. Cadot, 1850
 Minette, 1852
 Les Femmes honnêtes, L. de Potter, 1852
 Deux mères, H. Boisgard, 1853
 Les Petits chiens de ces dames, A. de Vresse, 1856
 La tribu des gêneurs, A. Cadot, 1857
 Les Femmes de la Bourse, A. Cadot, 1858
 Les Mystères du village, A. Cadot, 1858
 Les Femmes honnêtes, A. Cadot, 1860
 La Fille à son père, F. Sartorius, 1860
 Les Amants de ma maîtresse, 1860
 Les Baisers maudits, F. Sartorius, 1861
 La Haine d'une femme, 1861
 Le Démon de l'alcôve, F. Sartorius, 1862
 La Dame aux émeraudes, A. Cadot, 1862
 Les Démons de la mer (la Fiancée du corsaire), 1862
 La Voleuse d'amour, A. Faure, 1863
 L'Amour bossu, E. Dentu, 1863
 Je t'aime !, F. Sartorius, 1863
 Je me tuerai demain, F. Sartorius, 1863
 La Voleuse d’amour, 1863
 Les Buveurs d'absinthe, 1863
 Les mémoires d'un cabotin, 1864
 Ninie Guignon, F. Sartorius, 1864
 La Chute d'un petit, F. Sartorius, 1864
 La Nouvelle Manon, A. Faure, 1864
 Contes pour tous : Les Pantoufles d'acier : Les Trois talismans, F. Sartorius, 1864
 Les Accapareuses, A. Faure, 1864
 La Reine des grisettes, A. de Vresse, 1864
 Le Roi des étudiants, A. de Vresse, 1864
 Les Petites chattes de ces messieurs, A. Faure, 1864
 Le Roman d'un jocrisse, F. Sartorius, 1864
 Les Treize nuits de Jane : Confessions d'une jolie femme, A. Cadot, 1864
 Les Hommes volants : Histoire extraordinaire, A. Cadot, 1864
 Les Mémoires d'un cabotin, A. Faure, 1864
 La Tigresse, A. Cadot, 1864
 Le Roman d'une femme pâle, A. Faure, 1865
 La Fée aux amourettes, F. Sartorius, 1865
 Le Guide de l'amoureux à Paris d'après le manuscrit original de Mme la Baronne de C***, A. Faure, 1865
 Les Trois luronnes, 1865
 Berthe l'Amoureuse, 1865
 La Vie au hasard, F. Sartorius, 1866
 Ma petite cousine, F. Sartorius, 1866
 L’Auberge des treize pendus, 1866
 Folies de jeunesse : Amours et amourettes, A. Cadot, 1866
 Comment aimait une grisette, A. Cadot et Degorce, 1867
 Ni fille, ni femme, ni veuve, F. Sartorius, 1867
 Beau filou : histoire d'un aimable voleur, A. Lacroix Verboeckhoven et Cie, 1867
 Le Marchand de curiosités, A. Faure, 1867
 Le Crime d'Horace Lignon, F. Sartorius, 1868
 La Chute d'un petit, 1868
 La Fille de son père, 1869
 Le roman d'une femme pâle, A. de Vresse, 1869
 Histoire des courtisanes célèbres, 1869 
 Mademoiselle ma femme, G. Paetz, 1869
 Morte et vivante, Degorce-Cadot, 1870
 Mademoiselle Croquemitaine, F. Sartorius, 1871
 Histoire des cocus célèbres, Bunel, 1871
 Souvenirs et notes intimes de Napoléon III à Wilhelmshoehe, Librairie internationale, 1871
 Histoire des libertins et libertines célèbres, 1871
 La Fille d'un de ces messieurs : Petits mystères du siège de Paris, E. Dentu, 1872
 La Grande empoisonneuse, 1872
 L'Art d'être heureux en ménage, A. Fayard, 1876
 Le Futur de ma cousine : Histoire bourgeoise, E. Dentu, 1876
 Le Guide de l'amoureux à Paris, 1877
 L'Amoureuse de son mari, A. Sagnier, 1878
 Le Monde où l'on rit jaune, A. Degorce-Cadot, 1882
 Ratée : Histoire d'hier, C. Marpon et E. Flammarion, 1884
 Les Douze travaux d'Ursule, L. Boulanger, 1885
 Le Château du bonheur : histoire bourgeoise, E. Dentu, 1891

Theatre

1846: L'Eau et le feu, one-act vaudeville
1849: La Danse des écus, one-act folie-vaudeville, with Marc Fournier
1850: Qui se dispute, s'adore, proverbe in one act, with Charles Potier
1850: L'Hôtel de Nantes, one-act vaudeville-carroussel, with Maurice Alhoy
1850: Les Rubans d'Ivonne, one-act comedy, with Lambert-Thiboust
1853: Le Mauvais gas, drama vaudeville in five acts
1854: La Vie en rose, five-act play, mingled with songs, with Théodore Barrière
1854: Le paradis perdu, five-act drama, mingled with songs, with Léon Beauvallet
1855: L'Histoire de Paris, 3 acts and 14 tableaux, with Barrière
1855: Les Grands siècles, play in three acts and 16 tableaux, with Barrière
1857: Le Panier de pêches, one-act comédie en vaudevilles, with Philibert Audebrand
1857: Après la pluie, one-act comédie-vaudeville
1859: Madame Croquemitaine, ou les Souterrains de la Roche-Noire, three-act vaudeville, with Charles Cabot
1860: La Maison du Pont Notre-Dame, drama in five and six tableaux, with Barrière
1860: Les trois amours de Tibulle, five-act comedy, in verse, with Barrière 
1862: Le Minotaure, one-act vaudeville
1865: Le Fils aux deux mères, five-act drama including one prologue
1867: La Fée aux amourettes, five-act comédie en vaudevilles, with Adolphe Guénée
undated: Il n'y a plus d'enfants, nightmare in 3 acts and 9 tableaux, with Ernest Blum
undated: Vade au cabaret, saynète mingled with songs

Songs
1844: Mizely !, romance, lyrics and music
1863: Ninette, polka for piano
undated: Chant alsacien !, romance, lyrics and music
1865: La Fée aux amourettes !, song, lyrics and music
undated: Gurth le matelot !, chant du soir, lyrics and music
1865: Jeanne qui pleure !, ditty, lyrics and music
undated: Ma petite Marie !, romance, lyrics and music
1869: Minette !, rédowa for piano

Bibliography 
 Camille Dreyfus, André Berthelot, La Grande encyclopédie, vol.21, 1886, (p. 584)
 Appletons' Annual Cyclopaedia and Register of Important Events, vol.17, 1893, (p. 590)
 Donald McCormick, Erotic literature: a connoisseur's guide, 1992, (p. 163)
 Yves Olivier-Martin, Histoire du roman populaire en France de 1840 à 1980, 2013, (p. 99-100)

19th-century French dramatists and playwrights
19th-century French novelists
French erotica writers
1819 births
Writers from Paris
1892 deaths